Henrik Löwdahl (born June 6, 1981) is a Swedish former ice hockey player. He last played with Örebro HK of the Swedish Hockey League (SHL).

Lowdahl made his Swedish Hockey League debut playing with Örebro HK during the 2013–14 SHL season.

References

External links

 Löwdahl retires

1981 births
Living people
Örebro HK players
Swedish ice hockey centres
Sportspeople from Örebro